"No Love" is a song by American singers Summer Walker and SZA from Walker's second studio album Still Over It (2021). An extended version with American rapper Cardi B was released on March 25, 2022, as the second single from the album alongside the official music video. The song was written by Walker, SZA, Sean Garrett, Charles Ocasey Jr and Sony Ramos, and produced by Forthenight. It was sent to rhythmic contemporary radio in the United States on March 29, 2022.

Composition and lyrics
"No Love" is a pop-inspired "unflinchingly raw, exquisitely pretty R&B" song that sees Summer Walker and SZA "regret defending a man who isn't worth it", as Walker sings in the third verse: "Tried to act like I wasn't good enough in your eyes / Funny now that you callin', that you ringin' my line". The chorus of the song "works as a mantra" as Walker sings: "All I wanna do is fuck, get drunk, take drugs". They complain about the time that was wasted because of "emotional intimacy" not happening, "promising to only involve themselves in no-strings-attached relationships in the future" over the "groovy" bass-heavy production of the song, which is intended to "provide a foil to the two singers' voices, grants the pair room to display the full-range of their vocal talents".

Critical reception
Writing for Clash, Josh Abraham wrote that "No Love" is "simply magnificent" and that "the soft, yet addictive vocals on this beautifully put together track allows for both artists to swim in harmony with each other". Meagan Jordan of Rolling Stone described the song as "a sex anthem about the need to sometimes 'fuck, get drunk,' without the messy emotions that could come with attachment". Kiana Fitzgerald of NPR Music felt that "Summer Walker's collaborations with other women stand out on the album", citing "the intentionally detached nature of" the song.

Credits and personnel

 Summer Walker – vocals, songwriting
 SZA – vocals, songwriting
 Cardi B – vocals, songwriting  (extended version)
 Sean Garrett – additional vocals, background vocals, vocal production, songwriting
 Forthenight – production, songwriting
 Sonni – co-production, songwriting
 MixedbyAli – mixing
 Curtis "Sircut" Bye – assistant mixing
 Colin Leonard – mastering
 David "Dos Dias" Bishop – recording
 Rob Bisel – recording
 Rehan Manickam - recording

Charts

Weekly charts

Year-end charts

Certifications

Release history

References

2022 singles
2021 songs
Summer Walker songs
SZA songs
Cardi B songs
Interscope Records singles
Songs written by SZA
Songs written by Sean Garrett